Dhool is a 2003 Indian Tamil-language masala film written and directed by Dharani. The film stars Vikram, Jyothika and Reema Sen. Vivek, Sayaji Shinde, Telangana Shakuntala, and Pasupathy, among others, play important roles. Produced by A. M. Rathnam at a cost of 7 crore, the film was released on 10 January 2003. It received positive reviews and was a commercial success. Dhool was remade in Telugu as Veede (2003), and in Sinhala as Ranja (2014).

Plot 
Arumugam  lives in a village and is a kindhearted man. There is a chemical factory in the village which releases toxic wastes into the river, and the villagers decide to give a petition to Minister Kaalaipandi  requesting him to close the factory. Arumugam and his childhood rival Eswari, along with her grandmother Mundakanni, leave to Chennai to meet Kaalaipandi, who has won from the village's constituency. All three reach Chennai and stay with Narayanan aka Narain, who also belongs to the same village but is settled in Chennai. Swapna, a fashion model, also lives near Narain's home, and she is attracted towards Arumugam, whereas Narain loves her. Arumugam meets Kaalaipandi amidst a heavy crowd and conveys the problems faced by their villagers due to water pollution. Kaalaipandi assures he will take swift action.

Meanwhile, Sornam and her brother Aadhi are local goons involved in many illegal activities with Kaalaipandi supporting them incognito. One day, Eswari accidentally collides with Aadhi, following which he tries to hit her, but she is saved by Arumugam. In the ensuing scuffle, Arumugam fractures Aadhi's hands. Now, Sornaka and Aadhi set an eye on Arumugam and decide to trouble him. They, along with Kaalaipandi's help, kidnap Arumugam and injure him badly. Kaalaipandi also informs that he will never take any action against the chemical factory in his village. Narain, Swapna, and Eswari rescue and treat Arumugam. Arumugam discloses the true image of Kaalaipandi and the culprits behind him to Eswari and Narain.

Arumugam decides to take revenge on Kaalaipandi and tarnish his image among the public. Arumugam uses Kaalaipandi's memo pad and forges a letter praising an adult movie and requesting it to be published in a daily newspaper. The newspaper editor believes it and publishes it the next day. This brings agitation among political parties, and people demand resignation from Kaalaipandi. Meanwhile, Sornaka decides to kidnap Eswari and kill Arumugam, but instead, Arumugam thrashes Sornaka's men and saves Eswari. Sornaka, while trying to escape, gets hit by a lorry and dies.

Kaalaipandi decides to bring back his lost image by staging a fast until death event, which will bring sympathy among citizens. Arumugam mixes his village's dirty water into the drink served to break the fast. When he discloses it on the media, fearing his position, Kaalaipandi attempts to kill the CM in hospital. Arumugam is arrested on a false case. When Kaalaipandi once again tries his luck to kill the CM, Arumugam uses his skills and gets Kaalaipandi killed on the hands of policemen (who were aiming for Arumugam). Arumugam returns to his village with Eswari and Mundakanni, while the CM, having escaped the attempts on his life; exposes Kaalaipaandi. It is also shown that both Arumugam and Eswari had developed a romantic interest in each other. The film ends with the whole village celebrating Arumugam's victory.

Cast 

Vikram as Arumugam
Jyothika as Eswari (Voice Dubbed By Savitha Reddy)
Reema Sen as Swapna (Voice Dubbed By Renuka Kathir)
Vivek as Narayanasamy (Narain)
Prem Sundar as Sullan
Sayaji Shinde as Minister Kaalaipandi
Telangana Shakuntala as Sornam
Pasupathy as Aadhi
Manoj K. Jayan as Sub-Inspector Karunakaran
Mayilsamy as Kunchacko, Narain's Friend (at times foil)
Paravai Muniyamma as Mundakanni Eswari
Kalairani as Arumugam's mother
Bosskey as Nakkeeran Magazine editor
Chitti Babu as Hari,Minister's PA (secretly supports Arumugam)
Chaplin Balu as Narain's Labour
Kottachi as Narain's labour
 Karnaa Radha
Shakeela as herself
Koena Mitra in a special appearance (Koduva Meesai item song)

Production 
After the success of their 2001 collaboration Dhill, Dharani and Vikram announced in February 2002 that they were to come together again for a project titled Dhool. The lead role had originally been offered to Vijay, who declined. The song "Aasai Aasai" was partially shot in Denmark, and plans had been earlier made to shoot song sequences in London, though the team later opted against doing so.  A huge set of a temple, a church, some houses and a shopping area, was erected at the Indian Express office premises.

Soundtrack 

The music was composed by Vidyasagar. A part of the song "Karimizhi Kuruviye" from the 2002 Malayalam film Meesa Madhavan was reused in "Aasai Aasai", which was later reused as "Rafta Rafta" with a slight change in tune in the 2004 Hindi film Hulchul, another film where the music was composed by Vidyasagar. The music of "Ithanundu Muthathile" and "Koduva Meesai" were used for two songs in Naaga, another film that Vidyasagar composed the music for.

Release and reception 
Upon release in January 2003, the film was financially successful, despite opening alongside other prominent ventures such as the Kamal Haasan-Madhavan starrer Anbe Sivam and Vijay's Vaseegara. Aarkhay of Rediff.com review praised Vikram's enactment citing that "Vikram is at his peak" and that "he seems as much at home with comedy as with action, in romance as in emotional sequences". Malathi Rangarajan of The Hindu said, "Vikram's brain-brawn combo does help sustain the tempo. It's only that there's nothing new that "Dhool" offers. But as long as the till keeps ringing, little else matters, you suppose". The film became a major success and cemented Vikram's status as a matinée idol in Tamil Nadu.

Remakes 
Dhool was remade in Telugu as Veede (2003), with Reemma Sen reprising her role, in Bengali as Ghatak (2006), and in Sinhala as Ranja (2014). A Hindi remake was planned by Guddu Dhanoa in 2004 with Sunny Deol and Gracy Singh starring, but the film failed to take off.

References

External links 
 

2000s action drama films
2000s masala films
2000s Tamil-language films
2003 films
Films directed by Dharani
Films scored by Vidyasagar
Films shot in Kollam
Indian action drama films
Tamil films remade in other languages